"Something's Gotten Hold of My Heart" is a song written by Roger Greenaway and Roger Cook.

Originally recorded by David and Jonathan, and then Gene Pitney in 1967, the latter's version of the song reached No. 5 on the UK Singles Chart in December 1967, but failed to chart in the United States. The song was subsequently covered by a number of other acts including Cilla Black, Allison Durbin (dubbed "Australia's Queen of Pop" in the 1960s) on her 1968 album I Have Loved Me a Man, Terry Reid, and Nick Cave and the Bad Seeds on their 1986 album of covers Kicking Against the Pricks. It was sung in French by Herbert Léonard in 1968 with the title "Quelque chose tient mon cœur" and in Italian by Pitney himself with the title "Uomo, non sai" ("Man, you don't know").

It achieved its greatest success in 1988 when Some Bizzare UK Record label released a cover version by Marc Almond. Originally recorded by Almond alone for his 1988 album The Stars We Are, the single version reunited it with its best-known singer, Gene Pitney. Their version became a number one single in the UK for four weeks in January 1989. The music video for this version was filmed on-location in Las Vegas.

Chart positions

Marc Almond featuring Gene Pitney (1989)

Marc Almond originally recorded the song as a solo track for his album The Stars We Are and was released as a follow up to his single "Bitter Sweet". By then, Gene Pitney had heard of Almond's version and offered to re-record it with him, as a duet. This version replaced the solo version which was put on the B-side of the single. The duet reached number one on the UK Singles Chart in January 1989.

Weekly charts

Year-end charts

Cover versions 
The song was covered by Vicky Leandros in 1968, along with a Greek version the same year titled "To Mistiko Sou" (Your secret) on her Greek album Vicky (To Mistiko Sou) which became a hit. The same year in French by Herbert Léonard "Quelque chose en moi tient mon cœur". In 1987 this song was covered, with alternative lyrics, by the band Window Speaks on the album Heartland. Following Marc Almond's success across Europe, in 1989 Leandros released a 12-inch remix of "To Mistiko Sou" in Greece which topped the Greek charts. Since its release, both the English and Greek versions of the song have appeared on various Leandros compilations worldwide. In 2010, Greek singer Maro Lytra covered Leandros' Greek version of the song produced by Dimitris Kontopoulos, and released it as the second single off her upcoming album. 

In 1986, the song was covered by Nick Cave & The Bad Seeds on the album Kicking Against the Pricks.

In 1996, Robson & Jerome covered the song for their second studio album Take Two (Robson & Jerome album).

In 2012, the song was covered by Joe McElderry and is featured on his fourth studio album, Here's What I Believe. In 1990, The Shadows recorded an instrumental cover of the song on their studio album Reflection.

Pate Mustajärvi recorded the Finnish version Sydän syrjällään as a duet with Sakari Kuosmanen in 1995. Finnish lyrics were by Juice Leskinen. The song appeared on the B-side of the single Emmanuelle.

The song was covered by Dana Winner on her 2001 album 'Unforgettable' which is a compilation album of many popular songs, from 'Moonlight shadow' to 'Morning has broken'. 

Another Finnish version called Sydämeni osuman sai was recorded by Siiri Nordin in 2003, with Finnish lyrics by Pauli Hanhiniemi.

The song was featured in the 2015 film The Lobster, where it was performed by Garry Mountaine and Olivia Colman.

The song was also adapted in the Bahasa Melayu with the title of "Tak Sanggup" by the defunct Malay pop group, X-Factor, in 2004.

The song was also covered by New Zealand singer Bic Runga in 2008 for her album Try to Remember Everything.

References

1967 songs
1967 singles
1989 singles
Gene Pitney songs
Marc Almond songs
Guys 'n' Dolls songs
European Hot 100 Singles number-one singles
UK Singles Chart number-one singles
Irish Singles Chart number-one singles
Number-one singles in Finland
Number-one singles in Germany
Number-one singles in Switzerland
Songs written by Roger Greenaway
Songs written by Roger Cook (songwriter)
Columbia Records singles
EMI Records singles
Pop ballads
Male vocal duets